The New York City Landmarks Preservation Commission (LPC), formed in 1965, is the New York City governmental commission that administers the city's Landmarks Preservation Law. Since its founding, it has designated over a thousand landmarks, classified into four categories: individual landmarks, interior landmarks, scenic landmarks, and historic districts.

The New York City borough of Brooklyn contains numerous landmarks designated by the LPC, including four scenic landmarks and several interior landmarks and historic districts. The following is an incomplete list. Some of these are also National Historic Landmark (NHL) sites, and NHL status is noted where known.

source: ; ; date listed is date of designation;

Historic districts

Individual landmarks

1–9

A–M

N–Z

Interior landmarks

Scenic landmarks

See also 
 National Register of Historic Places listings in Kings County, New York
 List of New York City Landmarks

Notes

References

External links
 NYC Landmarks Preservation Commission
NYC Landmarks Designation Reports
New York City Landmarks Preservation Commission flickr Group

 
 
Locally designated landmarks in the United States
New York City Designated Landmarks In Brooklyn
New York City Designated Landmarks in Brooklyn
Brooklyn